Tinu may refer to:
 Tinu in Estonia
 Tinu Yohannan, Indian cricketer
 Tubulointerstitial nephritis and uveitis (TINU)